The Shire of Myrtleford was a local government area about  northeast of Melbourne, the state capital of Victoria, Australia.

History

Myrtleford was created from parts of the Shire of Bright on 31 May 1960.

On 18 November 1994, the Shire of Myrtleford was abolished, and along with the Shire of Bright and various surrounding districts, was merged into the newly created Alpine Shire.

Ridings
Myrtleford was not divided into ridings, and its nine councillors represented the entire district.

Towns and localities
 Barwidgee
 Buffalo River
 Merriang
 Myrtleford*
 Ovens

* Council seat.

Population

* Estimate in the 1958 Victorian Year Book.

References

External links
 Victorian Places - Myrtleford and Myrtleford Shire

Myrtleford